Agladrillia piscorum is a species of sea snail, a marine gastropod mollusk in the family Drilliidae.

Description
The length of the shell attains 12.6 mm. The teleoconch contains 6 convex whorls. The white shell shows no microscopic granules or labral ridges. The penultimate whorl contains 28-31 spiral threads and 10-11 strong, axial ribs. The base of the shell is moderately constricted. The siphonal canal is fairly broad and obliquely truncate. The parietal pad is terminal.

Distribution
This marine species occurs in the Agulhas Bank, South Africa.

References

Endemic fauna of South Africa
piscorum
Gastropods described in 1988